"Countdown" is the second and final single from the album Separations by British band Pulp. The song was re-recorded for the single release. The CD single cover stated the same track listing as 12" single but the tracks were reversed.

Track listing
All songs written and composed by Pulp.
12" vinyl
"Countdown" (extended version) – 8:05
"Death Goes to the Disco" – 5:44
"Countdown" (radio edit) – 4:42

CD single
"Countdown" (radio edit) – 4:42
"Death Goes to the Disco" – 5:44
"Countdown" (extended version) – 8:05

References

1991 singles
Pulp (band) songs
Songs written by Jarvis Cocker
1991 songs
Fire Records (UK) singles